is a Japanese manga series written and illustrated by Ryōhei Saigan. It has been serialized in Shogakukan's seinen manga Big Comic Original since 1974, with its chapters collected in 69 tankōbon volumes as of May 2022. It has been adapted into an anime television series broadcast from 1990 to 1991 and three live-action films: Always: Sunset on Third Street (2005), Always: Sunset on Third Street 2 (2007) and Always: Sunset on Third Street '64 (2012). It won the 27th Shogakukan Manga Award for general manga in 1982.

Overview
Set in post-war Japan between 1955 and 1964, it focuses on stories illustrating the humor and pathos of ordinary life in the Japan of that era, mainly about the residents of the fictional Tokyo neighborhood "Sunset on Third Street". However, many stories take place with one-story characters (not only people but animals and legendary creatures) and in other parts of Japan.

Media

Manga
Shogakukan has collected its chapters into individual tankōbon volumes. The first volume was released on September 29, 1975. As of May 30, 2022, sixty-nine volumes have been released.

Anime
A twenty-seven episode anime television series adaptation by Group TAC was broadcast on MBS from October 12, 1990, to September 21, 1991.

Live-action films

The series has been adapted into three live-action films premiered in Japan. Always: Sunset on Third Street, premiered on November 5, 2005; Always: Sunset on Third Street 2, premiered on November 3, 2007; and Always: Sunset on Third Street '64, premiered on January 21, 2012.

Reception
Sunset on Third Street won the 27th Shogakukan Manga Award for general manga in 1982.

References

External links

Sunset on Third Street
1974 manga
1990 anime television series debuts
Anime series based on manga
Group TAC
Mainichi Broadcasting System original programming
Seinen manga
Shogakukan manga
TBS Television (Japan) original programming
Winners of the Shogakukan Manga Award for general manga